Richard Coleman (28 September 1908 – 3 March 1943), better known as Dick Corbett, was a two-time British bantamweight champion. He was from Bethnal Green, London.

Boxing career
According to his traceable fight record Corbett remained undefeated between 1926 (the year of his pro debut) and 1927. His first defeat was at the hands of future British flyweight champion, Bert Kirby. Dick fought and beat Willie Smith while defending the Empire bantamweight title. Dick fought and beat Johnny King for the vacant British bantamweight title and the Commonwealth (British Empire) bantamweight title, and would fight Johnny King a further four times. In their second bout Corbett lost his British and Commonwealth bantamweight titles to King, but he regained both titles in their third meeting. Their fourth and fifth fights were both draws and so left Corbett the title holder. Corbett also won the British (Southern Area) Featherweight Title by defeating Dave Crowley.

Personal life
Coleman was son of Henry and Elizabeth Coleman.

Coleman was one of 173 who died during the Bethnal Green Disaster during World War II, leaving a widow Lilian Rose. He was a younger brother of the British featherweight champion Harry Corbett.

Championships and accomplishments
British Boxing Board of Control
List of British bantamweight boxing champions (2 times)
British (Southern Area) Featherweight Title 1 time
Commonwealth (British Empire) bantamweight Title 1 time

See also
List of British bantamweight boxing champions
British Boxing Board of Control
National Sporting Club

References

External links
 Dick Corbett (Bethnal Green) Nipper Pat Daly - British Boxing History
 

1908 births
1943 deaths
Flyweight boxers
Bantamweight boxers
Featherweight boxers
English male boxers
Boxers from Greater London
Place of death missing
British civilians killed in World War II